The 2008–2009 Jordanian pro  League is the 57th season of the top-flight football in Jordan.From this season, the name of the league has changed to the Jordanian Pro League .  The championship was won by Al-Wehdat, while Shabab Al-Hussein was relegated. A total of 10 teams participated.

Teams

Map

Managerial Changes

Final league standings

References

 Jordan - List of final tables (RSSSF)

2003
Jordan
1